Manatee County is a county in the U.S. state of Florida. As of the 2020 US Census, the population was 399,710. Manatee County is part of the Bradenton-Sarasota-Venice, Florida Metropolitan Statistical Area. Its county seat and largest city is Bradenton. The county was created in 1855 and named for the Florida manatee, Florida's official marine mammal. Features of Manatee County include access to the southern part of the Tampa Bay  estuary, the Sunshine Skyway Bridge, and the Manatee River.

History

Prehistoric history 
The area now known as Manatee County had been inhabited by Native Americans for thousands of years. Shell middens and other archaeological digs have been conducted throughout the county including at Terra Ceia and at Perico Island. These digs revealed materials belonging to peoples from the Woodland period.

European exploration and early settlement 

Some historians have suggested that the southern mouth of the Manatee River was the landing site of the De Soto Expedition.

Due to conflict during the Patriot War and First Seminole War, many African Americans fled north Florida and some settled in modern-day Bradenton. The settlement they founded on the Manatee River was called Angola. By 1819, the population of Angola possibly reached as high as 600-700 people.

The area was opened to settlement in 1842 with the passing of the Armed Occupation Act. Early settlements included the Manatee Colony led by Colonel Samuel Reid, which numbered thirty one individuals both black and white. Other prominent early settlers were Joseph and Hector Braden who moved into an area near the Manatee River in 1842. The two had lost their land for their plantations in Northern Florida during the Panic of 1837. They were said to have heard that there was abundant land in the area. The brothers moved into a log cabin 5 miles north of the mouth of the Manatee River. Four years later Hector had drowned while trying to cross the Manatee River on his horse during a hurricane. Despite this tragic event, Joseph decided he would still build his sugar plantation, the Braden sugar mill at the mouth of the Manatee River and the Braden River. He later built a dock where Main Street was and fortified the area near his house building a stockade. A few years later in 1851, he would build the Braden Castle, which was made out of tabby and served as his residence. In Spring of 1856, the fortified home was attacked by Seminole Indians during the Third Seminole War. It would later become a popular tourist attraction in the early 1900s with Tin Can Tourists. He would only stay there for the next six years before moving to Tallahassee.

County formation and the American Civil War 
When Manatee County was created in January 1855, it covered 5,000 square miles and included all of what are now Charlotte County, DeSoto County, Glades County, Hardee County, Highlands County, Sarasota County and part of Lee County. The original county seat was Manatee, a village in what is now eastern Bradenton.

Following the Seminole Wars, Manatee County continued to grow both in population and in economic output. Cattle, hogs, and some sheep were all raised, and processed sugar and molasses was produced and exported. This agricultural economy, like much of the south, was increasingly becoming reliant on slave labor. A federal census in 1860 showed that the county had a population of 601 white people and 214 enslaved black people. After the outbreak of the American Civil War, Manatee County provided supplies to the Confederate army. According to a partial list of soldiers of the Confederate States of America, the county also sent at least 100 of its citizens to fight. Some of the men from Manatee would be recruited to the 7th Florida Infantry Regiment, which fought as part of the Army of Tennessee.

Within Manatee County is the Gamble Plantation, a sugar plantation and home of Major Robert Gamble. According to some, following the Civil War, the Confederate Secretary of State, Judah P. Benjamin, took refuge at the mansion before escaping to England. In 1866, the county seat was temporarily moved from Manatee to Pine Level but was moved back in 1889. The move was reportedly done in an effort to make the county seat more centrally located but some historians also contend that it was done by the reconstructionists to punish Manatee for being a hotbed of rebel sympathies before and during the Civil War.

Geography

Adjacent counties
 Hillsborough County – north
 Polk County – northeast
 Hardee County – east
 DeSoto County – southeast
 Sarasota County – south

State & Nationally protected areas

 De Soto National Memorial
 Passage Key National Wildlife Refuge
 Lake Manatee State Park
 Terra Ceia Preserve State Park
 Myakka River State Park
 Madira Bickel Mound State Archaeological Site
 Beker-Wingate Creek State Park

Rivers
 Manatee River
 Wares Creek
 Braden River
 Gamble Creek

Lakes 
 Ward Lake
 Lake Parrish
 Lake Manatee

Demographics

As of the 2020 United States census, there were 399,710 people, 150,345 households, and 99,157 families residing in the county. By age, the population was spread out as such: 4.6% under 5 years old, 18.0% under 18 years old, and 28.1% 65 years and over. 51.7% of the population was female.

The median income for a household in the county was $59,963 in 2020 dollars and a per capita income in the past 12 months of $35,146. There were a reported 10.9% of the popular living in poverty.

Economy
Bealls of Florida has its headquarters and was founded 1915 in unincorporated Manatee County.

Tropicana was founded here in the 1950s. They were later bought by PepsiCo in 2001. They later sold it to a French private equity firm in 2021.

Libraries

The Manatee County Public Library System offers a collection of adult, young adult, and children's materials, as well as a genealogy section and a local history collection in the form of the Eaton Florida History Reading Room. Public computers are available at all library locations. The library also has a digital collection which includes e-books through OverDrive, Inc.; television shows, movies and more e-books through Hoopla; and magazines through Flipster; and local images and documents from the late nineteenth century to the early 1980s.

The libraries also offer author luncheons, children's story times, summer reading programs, job fairs, and book discussion groups.

The library system serves the county in six locations:
 Central - Bradenton
 Palmetto - Palmetto
 Braden River - Bradenton
 Island - Holmes Beach
 South Manatee - Bradenton
 Rocky Bluff - Ellenton
 Talking Book Library is administered through the Bureau of Braille and Talking Books Library, Daytona 

In September 2021, a seventh branch was approved by county commissioners, to be built in Lakewood Ranch.

Library cards are free to those who reside, own property, attend school, or work in Manatee County. Non-residents may obtain a temporary card upon payment of a $25.00 annual fee.

Manatee County participates in the Little Free Library program. There are several Little Free Libraries at parks and other public places around the county.

History of libraries

Manatee County's first public library was a privately owned rental library created by Julia Fuller at the Mrs. Bass Dry Goods store in 1898. The county's first independent library opened in Bradenton in 1907, followed a Carnegie Library in Palmetto in 1914 and another in Bradenton in 1918. For much of the 20th century, both cities' libraries were free to city residents while county residents had to pay a non-resident fee. In 1964, Bradenton's and Palmetto's library associations merged with the Manatee County government to create the Manatee County Public Library System. This was followed by the establishment of a bookmobile for rural areas in 1964 and a Talking Books program for the blind in 1966.

As demands on the bookmobile grew and the library collection outstripped the existing buildings in Bradenton and Palmetto, the first branch of the Manatee County Public Library system was built in Bayshore in 1967, followed by a new branch on East Ninth Street in 1969 and an Island branch in 1971, the last of which later moved into a new building in 1983. A new building for the Palmetto Library was built in 1969, followed by the modern Central Public Library in downtown Bradenton in 1978.

The 1990s saw a period of rapid growth in Manatee County, and the library system grew accordingly, with the Braden River, Rocky Bluff, and South Manatee branches opening in 1991, 1994, and 1998, respectively. The Braden River branch moved to a new building in 1997. The Rocky Bluff location would be moved to a larger location, featuring a built in café, in 2011. The new location is still physically within Ellenton. The additions as well as investment into various technologies such as modern computers, a 3D Printing Lab, as well as new loanable items, brings Manatee County Libraries to its modern services.

Reciprocal borrowing began in 2000 between Manatee and Sarasota County Libraries, which would be followed by statewide reciprocal borrowing programs. Starting in 2017, the Manatee County library system began offering items including musical instruments, tools, telescopes, binoculars, cake pans, hotspots, and museum passes. During the COVID-19 Pandemic, the library system began offering WiFi hotspots to patrons in order to provide internet service remotely to work safely and at home. This began in Spring of 2020.

On December 15, 2021, the county broke ground for a new East County library, which was to serve the community of Lakewood Ranch. The new library is scheduled to open mid-2023.

Education

Primary and secondary education
 Manatee County School District – Public K-12 School district serving all of Manatee County

Higher education
 Lake Erie College of Osteopathic Medicine (LECOM) Bradenton – Private, non-profit graduate school of medicine, dentistry, and pharmacy
 State College of Florida, Manatee–Sarasota (SCF) – Public, four-year state college, branch campus of State College of Florida

Communities

Cities
 Anna Maria
 Bradenton
 Bradenton Beach
 Holmes Beach
 Palmetto

Town
 Longboat Key

Census-designated places

 Bayshore Gardens
 Cortez
 Ellenton
 Lakewood Ranch
 Memphis
 Samoset
 South Bradenton
 West Bradenton
 West Samoset
 Whitfield

Unincorporated places

 Cedar Hammock
 Duette
 Elwood Park
 Fort Hamer
 Foxleigh
 Gillette
 Lake Manatee
 Manavista
 Manhattan
 Marsh Island
 Memphis Heights
 Myakka City
 Oak Knoll
 Oneco
 Palm View
 Palma Sola
 Parrish
 Rattlesnake Key
 Rubonia
 Rye
 Snead Island
 Tara
 Terra Ceia
 Verna
 Village of the Arts
 Ward Lake
 Waterbury
 Willow

Transportation
Manatee County has a county transportation service, MCAT. It serves this county, Pinellas County, and Sarasota County.

Airports
 Sarasota–Bradenton International Airport
 Airport Manatee 48X, a small local airport located near US Highway 41 and SeaPort Manatee.

Major Roads

Interstates
  Interstate 75 - The county's major north–south limited-access freeway, with a portion of the Interstate having express lanes between the interchanges with US 301 in Ellenton (Exit 224) and State Road 64 in Bradenton (Exit 220). There is a total of 5 Interchanges for I-75 in Manatee County, with most having at least six lanes in half of the freeway (North of Manatee River) and the other half having at least eight lanes (South of Manatee River)
  Interstate 275 -The Interstate begins westward from I-75 near Palmetto and has an interchange with US Highway 41 (Tamiami Trail) and begins a concurrency with US Route 19 for the next 13 miles (21 km). Travellers will soon reach the northbound toll plaza for the Sunshine Skyway Bridge. The Sunshine Skyway Bridge spams throughout Tampa Bay until it reaches St. Petersburg

US Highways

  U.S. Route 19
  U.S. Route 41
  U.S. Route 301

State and County Roads

  State Road 64
  State Road 70
  State Road 684 (Cortez Road)
  State Road 789
  State Road 62
  State Road 37
  Rutland Road
  University Parkway

Waterways
 Intracoastal Waterway
 Manatee River

Ports 
 SeaPort Manatee

Government

Political history
Manatee County is part of the strongly Republican Sun Belt. The area became a Republican stronghold following World War II and has remained so since: the last Democrat to win Manatee County was Franklin D. Roosevelt in 1944.

During the peak of the Socialist Party's prominence in the early 20th century, Manatee County would elect the only socialist to the state legislature, Andrew Jackson Pettigrew to the Florida House of Representatives in 1906 for one term defeating John A. Graham (who was a Democrat) in the general election. As a state legislator he would make several proposals that were inline with what the Party reflected at the national level such as making US Senators popularly elected and creating a national income tax. Overall as a state legislator he would make little progress in getting legislation proposed by him passed. Prior to the 1906 race he would run in 1904 for the same position unsuccessfully losing to A.T. Cornwell (also a Democrat) who had served as Bradenton's first mayor and in a variety of positions at the county level. Pettigrew would later go on to run for Governor in 1908 and Secretary of Agriculture in 1912 being unsuccessful in both races.

In 1970, Governor Claude R. Kirk Jr. fired Manatee County's superintendent along with the entire school board and appointed himself in their place in an attempt to end desegregation busing. This situation would last from April 6 to 13 before Kirk left his position as the superintendent.

Law enforcement and justice

Sheriff's Office 
Unincorporated Manatee County is served by the Manatee County Sheriff's Office.

Justice

Circuit Court 
Manatee County is a part of the Twelfth Circuit Court of Florida.

Court of Appeals 
Manatee County is part of the Second District of Appeals.

Recent presidential election results

Government officials

United States Senate

United States House of Representatives

Florida State Senate

Florida House of Representatives

Manatee County Board of County Commissioners
The Board of Commissioners include the following:

Public education

Other offices

Voter registration
Information as of March 31, 2022.

See also

 National Register of Historic Places listings in Manatee County, Florida

Notes

References

External links

 Manatee Chamber of Commerce

 
Florida counties
1855 establishments in Florida
Florida placenames of Native American origin
Sarasota metropolitan area
Counties in the Tampa Bay area